The 2017–18 Arizona State Sun Devils men's basketball team represented Arizona State University during the 2017–18 NCAA Division I men's basketball season. The Sun Devils were led by third-year head coach Bobby Hurley, and played their home games at Wells Fargo Arena in Tempe, Arizona as members of Pac–12 Conference. They finished the season 20–12, 8–10 in Pac-12 play to finish in a tie for eighth place. They lost in the first round of the Pac-12 tournament to Colorado. They received an at-large bid to the NCAA tournament where they lost in the First Four to Syracuse.

Previous season
The Sun Devils finished the 2016–17 season 15–18, 7–11 in Pac-12 play to finish in 8th place. They received the #8 seed in the 2017 Pac-12 tournament. In the tournament, the Sun Devils' defeated #9 Stanford in the first round before losing to #1 seed Oregon in the quarterfinals.

Off-season

Departures

Incoming transfers

2017 recruiting class

2018 Recruiting class

Roster

 Sophomore forward Ramon Vila decided to transfer.
 Transfer forward Carlton Bragg decided to transfer.

Depth chart

Schedule and results

|-
!colspan=12 style=|Exhibition

|-
!colspan=12 style=|Non-conference regular season

|-
!colspan=12 style=| Pac-12 regular season

|-
!colspan=12 style=| Pac-12 tournament

|-
!colspan=12 style=| NCAA tournament

Ranking movement

^Coaches Poll did not release a Week 2 poll at the same time AP did.
*AP does not release post-NCAA tournament rankings. Number in parenthesis indicates number of first place votes.

References

Arizona State Sun Devils men's basketball seasons
Arizona State
Arizona State
2017 in sports in Arizona
2018 in sports in Arizona